Hungary was represented by Csézy in the Eurovision Song Contest 2008 with the song "Candlelight".

Before Eurovision

Eurovíziós Dalverseny 2008: Magyarországi döntő 
Eurovíziós Dalverseny 2008: Magyarországi döntő was the Hungarian national selection which selected the Hungarian entry for the Eurovision Song Contest 2008. The show took place on 8 February 2008 at Pólus Center's Fortuna Stúdió in Budapest, hosted by Éva Novodomszky and Levente Harsányi and was broadcast on m1.

Format 
The competition featured fifteen entries where the Hungarian entry for Belgrade was selected by a four-member judging panel and votes from the public. Each judge assigned scores to each entry ranging from 1 (lowest score) to 10 (highest score) immediately after the artist(s) conclude their performance and the sum of all the jury scores created an overall ranking from which points from 1 (lowest) to 15 (highest) were distributed. The public submitted their vote via telephone or an SMS and the overall ranking of the entries was also assigned points from 1 to 15. The summation of the judges scores and the public vote determined the winning entry.

The judging panel consisted of:

 Miklós Malek – Ferenc Erkel award-winning composer and conductor
 László Benko – rock musician and composer
 Eszter Horgas – flautist
 Balázs Lévai – MTV programme editor

Competing entries 
Artists and composers were able to submit their applications and entries for the competition between 10 November 2007 and 12 December 2007. Competing artists were required to either hold Hungarian citizenship or be able to speak Hungarian fluently. In addition, only artists that had a valid contract with a record company/professional management and that had released an album were eligible to compete. Artists were also required to submit their songs in both English and Hungarian. After the submission deadline had passed, 30 entries were received by the broadcaster. A four-member preselection jury selected fifteen entries for the competition. The jury consisted of Miklós Malek, László Benko, Eszter Horgas and Balázs Lévai. The competing artists were announced on 14 January 2008.

Final 
The final took place on 8 February 2008 where fifteen entries competed. "Szívverés" performed by Csézy was selected as the winner via the combination of votes from a jury and a public vote submitted through telephone and SMS. Adrien Szekeres and Csézy were both tied with 29 points but since Csézy received the most votes from the public she was declared the winner. In addition to the performances of the competing entries, guest performers included 1994 Hungarian Eurovision entrant Friderika Bayer, 1997 Hungarian Eurovision entrants V.I.P., 2005 Hungarian Eurovision entrants Nox and 2007 Hungarian Eurovision entrant Magdi Rúzsa.

Preparation 
Following Csézy's win at the national selection, the English version of "Szívverés", titled "Candlelight", was released on 11 February 2008.

At Eurovision
In previous years, if a country placed in the top 10 countries in the final they automatically qualified to the final of the next contest. Had this rule remained for the 2008 contest, Hungary would have directly qualified for the final. However, a change in rules due to the large intake of countries participating in the contest meant that only five countries, the host country and the Big Four countries, would automatically qualify to the final. As such, Hungary were forced to compete in one of the two semi-finals of the 2008 contest in Serbia.
She competed in the second semi-final on May 22, performing fifteenth. She placed nineteenth and last with six points, getting four points from Serbia, one from Georgia and one from Denmark.

Gábor Gundel Takács provided commentary on Hungarian television and Éva Novodomszky was the Hungarian spokesperson.

Voting

Points awarded to Hungary

Points awarded by Hungary

References

2008
Countries in the Eurovision Song Contest 2008
Eurovision